Kärevere is a village in Türi Parish, Järva County in central Estonia.

It has a railway station on the Tallinn - Viljandi railway line operated by Elron (rail transit).

References

 

Villages in Järva County